Khal-Naaikaa is a 1993 Indian Hindi-language thriller film, produced and directed by Saawan Kumar under the Saawan Kumar Productions banner. It stars Jeetendra, Jaya Prada, Anu Aggarwal  and music composed by Mahesh - Kishore. It is based on the 1992 Hollywood film The Hand That Rocks the Cradle.

Plot

Homemaker Jaya Kapoor (Jayaprada) is happily married and lives with her husband Ravi Kapoor (Jeetendra) and two children, a girl Sahiba, and a baby boy Munna. At a check-up, she is sexually molested by her obstetrician, Dr. Rajan Bakshi (Puneet Issar). Traumatized, she tells Ravi, who encourages her to report Dr. Bakshi to the medical board. Her initial accusation and with the help of their journalist friend Varsha Sharma (Varsha Usgaonkar), four more women come forward about Dr. Bakshi assaulting them, and multiple charges are prepared against him. Dr. Bakshi commits suicide to avoid being arrested. Bakshi's pregnant widow Anuradha (Anu Aggarwal); stressed about her husband's suicide, falls unconscious, goes into pre-term labor, and loses her baby. While recovering in the hospital, she sees a news story identifying Jaya as the one who reported her husband. Unaware of her husband's misdemeanour, she blames Jaya for wrecking their happy married life and swears revenge.

Months later, Jaya looks for a nanny and she unknowingly hires Anuradha, who is going under the alias "Kiran". Anuradha wages a campaign to undermine Jaya in her household. She frequently breastfeeds Munna in secret; this causes him to reject Jaya, as he stops taking her milk. Anuradha encourages Jaya's daughter Sahiba to keep secrets from her mother and tries to turn her against Jaya. Anuradha also suggests to Ravi that he arrange a surprise party for Jaya, leading Varsha and Ravi to meet in secret. Jaya accuses Ravi of having an affair with Varsha and this leads to tension between the couple.

Gangaram (Mehmood), an intellectually disabled gardener who has been assisting the Kapoors and is friendly with Sahiba, discovers Anuradha breastfeeding Munna. To prevent him from exposing her, Anuradha plants nude pictures of Jaya in Gangaram's living quarters which leads Ravi into beating him up and firing him. Unknown to the family, except for Sahiba, Gangaram keeps a watchful eye over them.

A now wary Jaya begins to suspect "Kiran's" hand in all of the recent incidents and suggests to Ravi that they should get rid of her. Anuradha overhears their conversation, and the next morning she boobytraps the greenhouse for Jaya. Varsha discovers Anuradha's identity, but before she can get in touch with Jaya, Anuradha tricks her into going into the greenhouse, where she is killed by the falling glass ceiling. Knowing that Jaya suffers from asthma, Anuradha empties all of Jaya's inhalers and takes Munna out for a walk. When Jaya arrives back home and finds Varsha's bloodied, glass-covered body, she has an asthma attack and is briefly hospitalized. Ravi is left distraught over both Varsha's death and his wife's condition; Anuradha attempts to seduce him, but he rejects her advances.

Jaya eventually uncovers the truth about Anuradha, confronts her, and reveals the truth to Ravi just as Anuradha claims that she and Ravi are having an affair. Ravi denies this claim and kicks her out. Jaya tells Ravi to call the police when she realizes that Anuradha was behind Varsha's death and that she was the intended target. Ravi calls the cops and the Kapoor house is placed under protection.

Anuradha breaks into the house and lures Ravi down to the basement where she hits him on the head, knocking him down the stairs and breaking his legs. Anuradha attempts to take Sahiba and Munna, but after seeing Anuradha assault her mother, Sahiba locks Anuradha in the nursery. Anuradha escapes and hears Munna in the treehouse. She enters and sees Gangaram aiding the kids' escape. When Jaya enters, Anuradha attempts to kill her but stops after Jaya appears to be having another asthma attack, prompting Anuradha to mock her. As Anuradha tries to take Munna, Jaya gets back up, having faked her asthma attack, and pushes Anuradha out of the treehouse, killing her. Touched at how Gangaram risked his life to protect her family, Jaya welcomes him back into their lives.

Cast
 Jeetendra as Ravi Kapoor
 Jayapradha as Jaya Ravi Kapoor
 Anu Aggarwal as Anuradha Rajan Bakshi  Kiran
 Mehmood as Gangaram
 Puneet Issar as Dr. Rajan Bakshi 
 Varsha Usgaonkar as Varsha Sharma Double Role 
 Sahebzadi Kohli as  Sahiba Kapoor, Ravi and Jaya's daughter
 Zain Ansari as Munna Kapoor, Ravi and Jaya's son
 Bharat Bhalla as Hanuman Sethia

Soundtrack

External links

References

1990s Hindi-language films
Indian mystery thriller films
1990s mystery thriller films
Films directed by Saawan Kumar Tak